Tadap may refer to:

 Tadap (1982 film), directed by Jyoti Sarup
 Tadap (1990 film), starring Chunky Pandey
 Tadap (2021 film), an Indian film starring Ahan Shetty and Tara Sutaria